David-Seth Kirshner (born 1973), is the Rabbi of Temple Emanu-El, in Closter, New Jersey.

Prior to becoming a congregational rabbi, he worked at the Jewish Theological Seminary, which he joined in 1999, serving as Senior Director of Institutional Advancement, overseeing the Seminary's development and outreach efforts. For five years, Kirshner also served as spiritual leader for the Hebrew Congregation of Fitzgerald, in Southern Georgia.

Rabbi Kirshner holds the following positions of leadership:

  President of the (2012–14) New York Board of Rabbis 
  President of the (2017–19) New Jersey Board of Rabbis
  Appointed to NJ Israel Commission by Governor Chris Christie (2012. Re-appointed (2x) by Governor Phil Murphy
  Member of the Chancellor’s Rabbinic Cabinet at the Jewish Theological Seminary
  Kellogg School of Rabbinic Management at Northwestern University, Inaugural class
  UJC Rabbinic Cabinet
  Former Board member of the Solomon Schechter Day School of Bergen County
  National Council of the American Israel Public Affairs Committee (AIPAC)
  Hartman Fellow in Jerusalem
  Executive Officer of the Jewish Federations of North America (JFNA)
  Board Member of the Leffell School (Westchester)

He has written articles for many media sources and is regularly published in the Jewish Standard, The Times of Israel,  The Bergen Record and The New York Times.

Rabbi Kirshner holds a BA degree from York University in Toronto, Canada and earned an MA in Hebrew Letters and Rabbinic Ordination from the Jewish Theological Seminary of America. Rabbi Kirshner is married to 'Dori Frumin Kirshner.

References

External links
If you voted for Hamas, Israel has a right to kill you, says president of NY Board of Rabbis (Mondoweiss, July 29, 2014).

Living people
1973 births
American Conservative rabbis
Jewish Theological Seminary of America semikhah recipients
People from Closter, New Jersey
York University alumni
21st-century American Jews